Omiodes maia is a moth of the family Crambidae. It is endemic to the Hawaiian islands of Kauai and Oahu.

The larvae feed on banana.

External links

Moths described in 1909
Endemic moths of Hawaii
maia